The 2015–16 Wichita State Shockers women's basketball team represents Wichita State University in the 2015–16 NCAA Division I women's basketball season. They play their home games at Charles Koch Arena, which has a capacity of 10,506. The Shockers, led by eighth year head coach Jody Adams and were members of the Missouri Valley Conference. They finished the season 8–22, 5–13 in MVC play to finish in eighth place. They lost in the first round of the Missouri Valley women's tournament to Bradley.

Roster

Schedule

|-
!colspan=9 style="background:#000; color:#FFC318;"| Exhibition

|-
!colspan=9 style="background:#000; color:#FFC318;"| Non-conference regular season

|-
!colspan=9 style="background:#000; color:#FFC318;"| Missouri Valley Conference regular season

|-
!colspan=9 style="background:#000; color:#FFC318;"| Missouri Valley Tournament

Rankings

See also
2015–16 Wichita State Shockers men's basketball team

References

Wichita State Shockers women's basketball seasons
Wichita State